Bolsius is a Dutch candle manufacturer founded by Antonius Bolsius in 1870.

The company is headquartered in Schijndel. Its United Kingdom subsidiary Bolsius UK Ltd is headquartered in Wiltshire. In 2020 Bolsius employs around 900 people. In 2021 it is closing its production location in Boxmeer. Most of the production is in Kobylin, Poland.

References

External links
 Bolsius
 Bolsius Professional UK
 British Candlemakers Federation
 Association of European Candle Makers

1870 establishments in the Netherlands
Candles
Chemical companies of the Netherlands
Manufacturing companies established in 1870
Manufacturing companies of the Netherlands
Companies based in North Brabant
Manufacturing companies of Poland